, also known by  and his Chinese style name , was a prince of Ryukyu Kingdom.

Prince Yuntanza was the second head of a royal family called Yuntanza Udun. His father was Yuntanza Chōken.

King Shō Kō dispatched a gratitude envoy for his accession to Edo, Japan in 1806. They sailed back in the next year.

He served as sessei from 1803 to 1816.

References

1768 births
1817 deaths
Princes of Ryūkyū
Sessei
People of the Ryukyu Kingdom
Ryukyuan people
18th-century Ryukyuan people
19th-century Ryukyuan people